The 1903–04 Michigan State Spartans men's basketball team represented Michigan State University for the 1903–04 college men's basketball season. The school was known as State Agricultural College at this time. The head coach was Chester Brewer coaching the team his first season. The team captain was Edward Balbach. The team finished the season with a 5–3 record as an independent.

Schedule

|-
!colspan=9 style=| Regular season
|-

1. Michigan State Media Guide list score as 62-10, while Eastern Michigan Media Guide list score as 34-14.

Source

References

Michigan State Spartans men's basketball seasons
Michigan State
Michigan State|Michigan
Michigan State|Michigan